Brza is a village in the municipality of Leskovac, Serbia. According to the 2002 census, the village has a population of 1211 people.

References

Boban Amerikanac zvani BRZANAC- ŽIVELI 🥃
Populated places in Jablanica District